The following is an overview of 1924 in film, including significant events, a list of films released and notable births and deaths.

Top-grossing films (U.S.)
The top ten 1924 released films by box office gross in North America are as follows:

Events
January 10 – CBC Distributions corp. is renamed and incorporated as Columbia Pictures.
D. W. Griffith, co-founder of United Artists, leaves the company.
April 17 – Entertainment entrepreneur Marcus Loew gains control of Metro Pictures, Goldwyn Pictures Corporation and Louis B. Mayer Pictures to create Metro-Goldwyn-Mayer (MGM)
November 15 – In Los Angeles, director Thomas Ince ("The Father of the Western") meets publishing tycoon William Randolph Hearst to work out a deal. When Ince dies a few days later, reportedly of a heart attack, rumors soon surface that he was murdered by Hearst.
Loews Theatres acquires the 4,000 seat Capitol Theatre in New York City becoming the flagship of the theatre chain and site of many future MGM premieres.
Joseph Schenck becomes president of United Artists.
Metro-Goldwyn-Mayer (MGM) considers making a film of The Wonderful Wizard of Oz. MGM and the estate of L. Frank Baum failed to come to an agreement so the rights were sold to Chadwick Pictures.

Notable films released in 1924
For the complete list of US film releases for the year, see United States films of 1924

A
Aelita, directed by Yakov Protazanov – (U.S.S.R.) 
The Alaskan (lost), directed by Herbert Brenon, starring Thomas Meighan and Estelle Taylor
Along Came Ruth (lost), directed by Edward F. Cline, starring Viola Dana
America, directed by D. W. Griffith, Neil Hamilton and Lionel Barrymore
Au Secours! (Help!), directed by Abel Gance, starring Max Linder – (France)

B
Ballet Mécanique, directed by Fernand Léger and Dudley Murphy – (France)
Beau Brummel, directed by Harry Beaumont, starring John Barrymore and Mary Astor
Behind the Curtain, directed by Chester M. Franklin, based on a story by William J. Flynn

C
Captain January directed by Edward F. Cline, starring Baby Peggy and Hobart Bosworth
Carlos and Elisabeth, directed by Richard Oswald, starring Conrad Veidt – (Germany)
Claude Duval, directed by George A. Cooper, starring Fay Compton and Nigel Barrie – (GB)
The City Without Jews (Die Stadt ohne Juden), directed by Hans Karl Breslauer – (Austria)

D
Dante's Inferno, directed by Henry Otto
The Dixie Handicap (lost), directed by Reginald Barker

E
The Enchanted Cottage, directed by John S. Robertson, starring Richard Barthelmess and May McAvoy
Entr'acte, directed by René Clair – (France)
The Extraordinary Adventures of Mr. West in the Land of the Bolsheviks (Neobychainye priklyucheniya mistera Vesta v strane bolshevikov), directed by Lev Kuleshov – (U.S.S.R.)

F
Forbidden Paradise, directed by Ernst Lubitsch, starring Pola Negri, Rod La Rocque and Adolphe Menjou
The Further Mysteries of Dr. Fu Manchu, eight-part series directed by A. E. Coleby  – (GB)

G
Girl Shy, directed by Fred C. Newmeyer and Sam Taylor, starring Harold Lloydand Jobyna Ralston  
The Grand Duke's Finances (Die Finanzen des Großherzogs), directed by F. W. Murnau – (Germany)
The Great Well, directed by Henry Kolker – (GB)
Greed, directed by Erich von Stroheim, starring Gibson Gowland and ZaSu Pitts

H
Happiness, directed by King Vidor, starring Laurette Taylor
The Hands of Orlac (Orlacs Hände), directed by Robert Wiene, starring Conrad Veidt, based on the 1920 novel by Maurice Renard – (Austria)
He Who Gets Slapped, directed by Victor Sjöström starring Lon Chaney, Norma Shearer and John Gilbert
Helena, directed by Manfred Noa – (Germany)
Helen's Babies, directed by William A. Seiter, starring Edward Everett Horton, Baby Peggy and Clara Bow
Her Night of Romance, directed by Sidney Franklin, starring Constance Talmadge and Ronald Colman
His Hour, directed by King Vidor, starring John Gilbert
Hot Water, directed by Fred C. Newmeyer and Sam Taylor, starring Harold Lloyd and Jobyna Ralston
The Humming Bird, directed by Sidney Olcott, starring Gloria Swanson

I
Icebound (lost), directed by William C. deMille, starring Lois Wilson and Richard Dix
L'Inhumaine (The Inhuman Woman), directed by Marcel L'Herbier – (France)
The Iron Horse, directed by John Ford, starring George O'Brien and Madge Bellamy
Isn't Life Wonderful, directed by D. W. Griffith

J
Janice Meredith, directed by E. Mason Hopper, starring Marion Davies

L
The Last Laugh (Der Letzte Mann), directed by F. W. Murnau, starring Emil Jannings – (Germany)
Little Robinson Crusoe, directed by Edward F. Cline, starring Jackie Coogan

M
The Marriage Circle, directed by Ernst Lubitsch
Michael, directed by Carl Theodor Dreyer – (Germany)
Monsieur Beaucaire, directed by Sidney Olcott, starring Rudolph Valentino, Bebe Daniels and Lois Wilson

N
The Navigator, a Buster Keaton film
Die Nibelungen: Siegfried, directed by Fritz Lang; starring Paul Richter – (Germany)
Die Nibelungen: Kriemhilds Rache, directed by Fritz Lang – (Germany)

O
On Time (lost), directed by Henry Lehrman, starring Richard Talmadge 
Open All Night, directed by Paul Bern, starring Viola Dana

P
Paris Qui Dort (Paris Which Sleeps), directed by René Clair – (France)
The Passionate Adventure, directed by Graham Cutts, starring Alice Joyce, Clive Brook and Victor McLaglen – (GB)
Peter Pan, directed by Herbert Brenon, starring Betty Bronson and Ernest Torrence

Q
Quo Vadis, directed by Gabriellino D'Annunzio and Georg Jacoby, starring Emil Jannings – (Italy)

S
The Saga of Gosta Berling (Gösta Berlings Saga), directed by Mauritz Stiller, starring Greta Garbo and Lars Hanson – (Sweden)
Sampaguita, directed by José Nepomuceno – (Philippines)
The Sea Hawk, directed by Frank Lloyd, starring Milton Sills
Secrets, directed by Frank Borzage, starring Norma Talmadge
The Shadow of the Desert (lost), directed by George Archainbaud, starring Mildred Harris and Norman Kerry 
Sherlock Jr., a Buster Keaton film
A Son of Satan (lost), written and directed by Oscar Micheaux
Stupid, But Brave, directed by William Goodrich (Roscoe "Fatty" Arbuckle)
Symphonie diagonale, directed by Viking Eggeling – (Germany)

T
The Thief of Bagdad, directed by Raoul Walsh, starring Douglas Fairbanks
Those Who Dare (lost), directed by John B. O'Brien
Three Weeks, directed by Alan Crosland, starring Conrad Nagel and Aileen Pringle
Three Women, directed by Ernst Lubitsch, starring May McAvoy, Pauline Frederick and Marie Prevost

U
Unseen Hands, directed by Jacques Jaccard, starring Wallace Beery

W
Waxworks (Das Wachsfigurenkabinett), directed by Paul Leni, starring Emil Jannings, Conrad Veidt and Werner Krauss  – (Germany)
What an Eye, written and directed by Edward Ludwig
Wild Oranges, directed by King Vidor
Wine (lost), directed by Louis J. Gasnier, starring Clara Bow
Wine of Youth, directed by King Vidor, starring Eleanor Boardman and William Haines

Y
Yolanda, directed by Robert G. Vignola, starring Marion Davies

Short film series
Buster Keaton (1917–1941)
Laurel and Hardy (1921–1943)
Our Gang (1922–1944)

Animated short film series
Koko the Clown (1919–1934)
Felix the Cat (1919–1936)
Alice Comedies (1923–1927)
 Alice's Day at Sea
 Alice's Spooky Adventure
 Alice's Wild West Show
 Alice's Fishy Story
 Alice and the Dog-Catcher
 Alice the Peacemaker
 Alice Gets in Dutch
 Alice Hunting in Africa
 Alice and the Three Bears
 Alice the Piper

Births
January 7 – Anne Vernon, French actress 
January 9 – Sergei Parajanov, Soviet director (died 1990)
January 14 – Carole Cook, American actress (died 2023)
January 16 – Katy Jurado, Mexican actress (died 2002)
January 21 - Benny Hill, English actor, comedian, singer and writer (died 1992)
January 26 – Armand Gatti, French filmmaker (died 2017)
January 29 – Dorothy Malone, American actress (died 2018)
February 12 – Louis Zorich, American actor (died 2018)
February 19 – Lee Marvin, American actor (died 1987)
March 5 - Harvey Bernhard, American producer (died 2014)
March 12 – Helen Parrish, American actress (died 1959)
March 15 - Walter Gotell, German actor (died 1997)
March 24 - Norman Fell, American actor (died 1998)
March 25 – Machiko Kyō, Japanese actress (died 2019)
April 3 – Marlon Brando, American actor (died 2004)
April 4 - Noreen Nash, American retired actress
April 7
Astrid Lepa, Estonian actress and director (died 2015)
Espen Skjønberg, Norwegian actor (died 2022)
April 13 – Stanley Donen, American director and choreographer (died 2019)
April 14
Joseph Ruskin, American actor (died 2013)
Philip Stone, English actor (died 2003)
April 18 – Leida Rammo, Estonian actress (died 2020)
April 19 - Tatiana Farnese, Italian actress (died 2022)
April 20
Nina Foch, Dutch-American actress (died 2008)
Leslie Phillips, English comic actor (died 2022)
April 24 – Eric Pleskow, Austrian film producer (died 2019)
April 29 – Heikki Haravee, Estonian actor (died 2003)
May 1 – Dodo Abashidze, Soviet Georgian director (died 1990)
May 2 – Theodore Bikel, Austrian-American actor (died 2015)
May 18 - Priscilla Pointer, American actress
June 2 - Al Ruscio, American character actor (died 2013)
June 4 – Dennis Weaver, American actor, SAG president (died 2006)
June 16 – Faith Domergue, American actress (died 1999)
June 21 – Ezzatolah Entezami, Iranian actor (died 2018)
June 25 – Sidney Lumet, American director (died 2011)
July 1 - Florence Stanley, American actress (died 2003)
July 3 - Amalia Aguilar, Cuban-born Mexican actress (died 2021)
July 4 – Eva Marie Saint, American actress
July 6 – Draga Ahačič, Slovene actress and director (died 2022)
July 14 - Val Avery, American actor (died 2009)
July 19 - Pat Hingle, American actor (died 2009)
July 20 – Lola Albright, American actress (died 2017)
July 21 – Don Knotts, American actor (died 2006)
July 29 -  Lloyd Bochner, Canadian actor (died 2005)
August 1 – Marcia Mae Jones, American actress (died 2007)
August 2 - Carroll O'Connor, American actor (died 2001)
August 10 – Martha Hyer, American actress (died 2014)
August 14 – Eduardo Fajardo, Spanish actor (died 2019)
August 19 - William Marshall, American actor (died 2003)
August 21 - Jack Weston, American actor (died 1996)
August 24 – Jimmy Gardner, English actor (died 2010)
August 28 – Peggy Ryan, American actress and dancer (died 2004)
August 29 – Tanis Chandler, French-born American actress (died 2006)
August 31 - Buddy Hackett, American actor, comedian and singer (died 2003)
September 1 - Hal Douglas, American voice actor (died 2014)
September 2 – Knud Leif Thomsen, Danish director and screenwriter (died 2003)
September 6 – Riccardo Cucciolla, Italian actor and voice actor (died 1999)
September 8 – Denise Darcel, French actress (died 2011)
September 9
Jane Greer, American actress (died 2001)
Sylvia Miles, American actress (died 2019)
September 11 - David Morris (actor), English actor (died 2007)
September 13
Norman Alden, American character actor (died 2012)
Scott Brady, American actor (died 1985)
September 16 – Lauren Bacall, American actress (died 2014)
September 21 – Gail Russell, American actress (died 1961)
September 23 – Bob Herron (stuntman), American stuntman and actor (died 2021)
September 28 – Marcello Mastroianni, Italian actor (died 1996)
September 29 - Peter Arne, British character actor (died 1983)
September 30 – Truman Capote, American author (died 1984)
October 1 – Jose Corazon de Jesus Jr., Filipino actor (died 1970)
October 12 - Doris Grau, American script supervisor, actress and voice artist (died 1995)
October 21 - Joyce Randolph, American actress
October 25 – Billy Barty, American actor (died 2000)
November 10
Russell Johnson, American actor (died 2014)
Paul Richards, American actor (died 1974)
November 16 - Remo Remotti, Italian actor (died 2015)
November 21 - Joseph Campanella, American actor (died 2018)
November 22 – Geraldine Page, American actress (died 1987)
November 26 – Jacqueline White, American actress
December 2 – Vilgot Sjöman, Swedish director (died 2006)
December 5 - George Savalas, American actor (died 1985)
December 13 - Maria Riva, American actress and writer
December 14
John Franklyn-Robbins, English actor (died 2009)
Raj Kapoor, Indian actor, director and producer (died 1988)
December 19 - Cicely Tyson, American actress, model and author (died 2021)
December 25 – Rod Serling, American screenwriter (died 1975)

Deaths
April 16 – Amleto Novelli, Italian stage and screen actor (born in 1885)
April 21 – Eleonora Duse, Italian veteran stage actress, who made one film in 1916 (born in 1858)
August 9 – L. Rogers Lytton, American stage and screen actor (born in 1867)
September 23 – Ben Deeley, film actor married to Barbara La Marr (born in 1878)
October 12 – Kate Lester, English veteran stage and film actress (born in 1857)
November 19 – Thomas Ince, American actor and pioneer film producer (born in 1882)

Film debuts
Clark Gable – White Man and Forbidden Paradise
Janet Gaynor – Cupid's Rustler
John Gielgud – Who Is the Man?
Johannes Heesters – Cirque hollandais

References

 
Film by year